Lilian M. Gibbard  Osborne (1877–1977) was a New Zealand artist known for her paintings of English wildflowers. She is the daughter of  botanical illustrator Fanny Osborne. She married Thomas Gibbard and moved to England, where she won medals at exhibitions of the Royal Horticultural Society.

References 

 https://findnzartists.org.nz/artist/5652/lilian-gibbard
 http://nzetc.victoria.ac.nz/tm/scholarly/tei-PlaNine-t1-body-d1-d475.html#name-124867-mention

New Zealand women artists
1877 births
1977 deaths
New Zealand painters
New Zealand emigrants to the United Kingdom
British women artists
British painters